Craig Dell Maskell (born 10 April 1968) is an English football coach and former footballer.

As a player, he was a centre forward who notably played in the Premier League for Southampton. He also played in the Football League for Huddersfield Town, Reading, Swindon Town, Brighton & Hove Albion and Leyton Orient,  later playing at non-league level for  Happy Valley, Hampton & Richmond Borough and Aylesbury United. He would both play and manage Staines Town from 2003 until 2012.

Playing career
Craig Maskell began his professional football career at Southampton where he'd previously signed as an apprentice. After playing a handful of games for the club, he was loaned to Swindon Town before his eventual transfer to Huddersfield Town.

A prolific goalscorer for the team, Maskell was later included in The Fans' Favourites, a book which lists the 100 Huddersfield Town players voted by the fans as their favourite players at the time of their centennial in 2008.

A spell at Reading was followed by his move to Swindon Town, under Glenn Hoddle; he scored at Wembley in the 1993 Division One Play-off Final to promote Swindon to the Premier League.

Following a poor season with the club in 1993–94, when they were relegated from the Premier League with only five wins all season, he was sold back to Southampton for £250,000, but his return to The Dell was not a success. He managed 17 Premier League appearances in two seasons, scoring just once, and unable to break up the three-man attack of Matthew Le Tissier, Neil Shipperley and Gordon Watson. He also faced competition for a place on the bench from the likes of Ronnie Ekelund and Neil Heaney.

He then played for Bristol City, Brighton and Hong Kong teams Happy Valley AA before arriving at Leyton Orient. His role at Brighton was distinguished by a shot that curled around the keeper and hit the post for Robbie Reinelt to score the rebound goal against Hereford that kept the Albion in the Football League.

His 18 months at Orient ended when, as part of the losing team in the 1999 Division Three play-off final, he walked off the pitch at the end of the game vowing never to play for the team again. "I turned to one of my team-mates and said 'that's enough', I'd spent too much time away from my family and too little time on the pitch at Orient."

Leyton Orient released him at the start of the 1999–00 season and he became assistant coach under manager Steve Cordery at Hampton & Richmond Borough. Maskell was leading goalscorer for the team at the end of the 1999–00 season and had helped the Isthmian League Premier Division club to reach the first round of the FA Cup for the first time.

Maskell and Cordery moved to Aylesbury in Summer 2002 and he was again amongst the Premier Division's top marksmen with 26 league and cup goals for the team.

The pair took over at Staines Town in 2003, where they continued to play and manage the team until April 2012.

Personal life
Maskell became a sports teacher at Southgate College during his time in non-league. He later returned to Hampshire to teach sports at Eastleigh College.

Career statistics

References

External links
 
 Player Profile – Swindon-Town-FC.co.uk
 Player Profile – Staines Town

Living people
1968 births
Sportspeople from Aldershot
Association football forwards
English footballers
Premier League players
English Football League players
Hong Kong First Division League players
Brighton & Hove Albion F.C. players
Bristol City F.C. players
Hampton & Richmond Borough F.C. players
Happy Valley AA players
Huddersfield Town A.F.C. players
Leyton Orient F.C. players
Reading F.C. players
Southampton F.C. players
Expatriate footballers in Hong Kong
Staines Town F.C. players
Swindon Town F.C. players
Aylesbury United F.C. players
English expatriate sportspeople in Hong Kong
English expatriate footballers
Footballers from Hampshire